Ins is a genus of flies belonging to the family Bombyliidae (bee-flies), with 10 described species, distributed throughout the Nearctic and Neotropics. These species were formerly placed in the genus Hemipenthes, but recognized as a separate lineage in 2020.

Species
Ins celeris (Wiedemann, 1828) - Nearctic: Mexico, USA. Neotropical: Costa Rica, Honduras, Panama
Ins constituta Walker, 1852 - Neotropical: South America.
Ins curta (Loew, 1869) - Nearctic: Mexico, USA. Neotropical: Mexico (Oaxaca, Yucatán).
Ins ignea (Macquart, 1846) - Neotropical: Colombia, Guyana, Panama.
Ins leucocephala (Wulp, 1882) - Neotropical: Argentina.
Ins martinorum (Painter in Painter & Painter, 1962) - Nearctic: Mexico (Michoácan de Ocampo)
Ins minas (Macquart, 1850) - Neotropical: Argentina, Brazil (Minas Gerais).
Ins pectorcolumbo Evenhuis, 2020 - Neotropical: El Salvador.
Ins pleuralis (Williston, 1901) -  Nearctic: Mexico (Colima, Guerrero, Morelos, Nayarit, Puebla). Neotropical: Mexico (Chiapas).
Ins zanouts Evenhuis, 2020 - Neotropical: Costa Rica, Panama.

References

Bombyliidae
Bombyliidae genera
Diptera of North America
Hyperparasites